Nogo is a set of two drums pierced by a pole and played in Korean court and ritual music.

References

Drums
Korean musical instruments
Asian percussion instruments
Musical instruments played with drum sticks
Unpitched percussion instruments
Korean traditional music